Juan Mario de la Espriella Salcedo better known as Juancho de la Espriella Salcedo (born February 26, 1973, in Sincelejo, Sucre) is a Colombian musician interpreter of vallenato in accordion. De la Espriella is the current accordionist of Colombian vallenato singer Mono Zabaleta.

References
"Juancho", as they call him baby, born on February 26, 1973, in Sincelejo, Sucre, a son of Rosario Salcedo and Carlos De La Espriella (RIP), who inherited much of his love of vallenato music.

Since very little inclination for the accordion was evident: after 3 years changed the toy cars and superheroes by an instrument of these. However, his love for the accordion began formally at age 13, when he began practicing long hours locked in his room, dreaming one day be recognized as one of the best.

Time passed and Juan Mario was emerging as a faithful follower of the school of Arturo Gonzalo "El Cocha" Molina, and this was evident when he played Juancho partying and serenades: the influence of the great accordion was visible in the notes of the accordion.

In the early 1990s and after waiting for a long time an opportunity to showcase their talent, Juancho Miguel Cabrera met, with whom he made his first musical called "little piece of my life 1994," the singer made one more album "lo mejor que tengo" 1996, where Juancho failed to show the potential he had in his veins.

After acquiring some musical maturity, in the late 90s, Juan Mario teamed with Peter Manjarrés. (1998) "Una nueva generacion"- (2000) Inolvidable-(2001) "un nuevo sentimiento" (2002) LLego El Momento. With musical productions he made four of which came off hits like "Your black love you", "Better not want much," "The Street", "Walk in harmony" and "It's time", among many others . 

In 2002 Juancho started a new period in his musical life with Dangond Silvestre, with whom he recorded six albums that earned him countless victories, with whom he worked until January 2012. (2002)"Llego el momento" -(2003)"Lo mejor para los dos" -(2004) Mas Unidos que nunca" -(2005) "Ponte a la Moda"-(2006)"La Fama"-(2008) "El Original"-(2010)"Cantinero"-(2012) "No me Compares Con Nadie".

That same month he joined with Martin Elias Diaz, a young man of Valledupar, heir to one of the most talented musical dynasties of all time and who has done an excellent musical partner, worthy of great prizes and recognition from the public and media. With Martin recorded "The boom of the moment," a musical production with a lot of maturity, which is perceived a youthful and modern, mixed with the professionalism that characterizes them.

However, Juancho's career does not stop here, there is a very important event that marked much of his musical maturity: the recording in 2003 of "Asking Road" with Diomedes Diaz the "Chief of the Board", father of the current musical companion, Elias Diaz Marin, this album was a success and further revealed the talent of this young artist, by then, already received the best reviews of review vallenato.
Even in 2006, recorded at Fiesta Juancho Beto Vallenata with Zabaleta and Jorge Celedon.

To Juancho all the good things that have happened in your life are due to God and his greatness. So every day give thanks for the good time is going on, but asks God if it comes to an end, her love never fades vallenato music, because it is part of its essence as a musician and as a person.
Juancho de la Espriella official website
parranda vallenata - La Fama: Silvestre & Juancho

1973 births
Living people
Colombian accordionists
People from Sincelejo